Penicillium ludwigii is an anamorph species of the genus of Penicillium.

References

Further reading

 

ludwigii
Fungi described in 1969